Walter Fitch may refer to:
Walter M. Fitch (1929–2011), American evolutionary biologist
Walter Hood Fitch (1817–1892), Scottish botanical artist